Greta Nissen (born Grethe Rüzt-Nissen; 30 January 1906 – 15 May 1988) was a Norwegian-American film and stage actress.

Stage and screen actress
Born Grethe Rüzt-Nissen in Kristiania (now Oslo), Norway, Nissen was originally a dancer. While still a student at the company's school in Copenhagen, she danced with the Royal Danish Ballet, debuted as a solo ballerina on the National Theatre in 1922. She toured in Norway and appeared in several Danish films.

Nissen made her Broadway debut as a ballerina in 1924. She had studied ballet with Michel Fokine. In early 1924, she came as a member of a Danish ballet troupe to New York, where she was soon hired to do a larger dance numbers for George S. Kaufman in the musical Beggar on Horseback. She was discovered by film producer Jesse L. Lasky of Paramount Pictures, and would appear in more than twenty films.

She appeared in The Wanderer (1925, director Raoul Walsh). Among her other films were  Lost: A Wife, The King on Main Street, The Love Thief, Ambassador Bill, The Lucky Lady, and Honours Easy.

Nissen was cast as Helen, the female lead in Hell's Angels, originally conceived as a silent film. Principal photography began on 31 October 1927, with an interior shot at the Metropolitan Studio in Hollywood. 

Midway through production, the advent of sound in motion pictures came with the arrival of The Jazz Singer. 

Director Howard Hughes incorporated the new technology into the half-finished film, but Nissen became a casualty of the new sound age, due to her pronounced Norwegian accent. He paid her for her work and cooperation, and replaced her, because her accent would make her role as a British aristocrat ludicrous.

In 1932, she played in The Silent Witness with Weldon Heyburn, who became her first husband. They married on 30 March 1932, in Tijuana, Mexico. On 19 October 1935, Nissen went to court to have the marriage annulled, "charging their marriage ... was illegal and violated legal witness and residence requirements." The annulment was granted on 30 April 1936.

In 1933, she moved to England. Her film career ended in the mid-1930s after she had appeared in a few British films. In 1937 she retired from movie acting altogether.

Critical acclaim

A 1925 New York Times review of the silent film A Norwegian Actress described Nissen as follows:She was graceful in her movements and expressions, with a constantly changing gaze. The actress was attractive rather than beautiful. Her chin and nose were both somewhat pronounced. Greta's personality was delightful and she never showed an awareness to the audience that she was conscious of being on camera. Her skin was fair and she possessed blonde hair. At different times her coiffure had a somewhat "wild" appearance.

The reviewer believed her hair was more effective when it was brushed down rather than when it was concealed by a small hat. As for her eyes, there was a close affinity in their appearance to those of Sarah Bernhardt. Mordaunt Hall commented on her acting, saying, "Miss Nissen gives a sincere and earnest portrayal, always obtaining excellent results with an originality rarely beheld on the screen".

Later years and death
On 1 June 1941, she married industrialist Stuart D. Eckert (1907–1993), and withdrew from public life. Nissen died at age 82 at her home in Montecito, California of Parkinson's disease on 15 May 1988. 

Her husband said she still received fan letters. She had one son, Tor Bruce Nissen Eckert, who, in 2005, donated his large collection of Greta Nissen Memorabilia to the Norwegian Emigrant Museum (Norsk Utvandrermuseum) which is located in Ottestad, Hedmark, Norway.

Gallery

Filmography

 Daarskab, dyd og driverter (1923) - Grethe
 Lille Lise let-paa-taa (1923) - Lise
 Lost: A Wife (1925) - Charlotte Randolph
 In the Name of Love (1925) - Marie Dufrayne
 The Wanderer (1925) - Tisha
 The King on Main Street (1925) - Thérèse Manix
 The Lucky Lady (1926) - Antoinette
 The Love Thief (1926) - Princess Flavia Eugenia Marie
 Ebberöds bank (1926)
 The Lady of the Harem (1926) - Pervaneh
 The Popular Sin (1926) - La Belle Toulaise
 Blonde or Brunette (1927) - Fanny
 Blind Alleys (1927) - Maria d'Alvarez Kirby
 Horse Shoes (1927)
 Fazil (1928) - Fabienne
 The Butter and Egg Man (1928) - Mary Martin
 Women of All Nations (1931) - Elsa
 Transatlantic (1931) - Sigrid Carline
 Ambassador Bill (1931) - Countess Ilka
 Good Sport (1931) - Peggy Bums
 The Silent Witness (1932) - Nora Selmer
 Rackety Rax (1932) - Voine
 The Unwritten Law (1932) - Fifi La Rue
 The Circus Queen Murder (1933) - Josie La Tour
 Melody Cruise (1933) - Elsa Von Rader
 Best of Enemies (1933) - The Blonde
 Life in the Raw (1933) - Belle
 Red Wagon (1933) - Zara
 On Secret Service (1933) - Marchesa Marcella Galdi
 Hired Wife (1934) - Vivian Mathews
 The Luck of a Sailor (1934) - Queen Helena
 Honours Easy (1935) - Ursula Barton
 Cafe Colette (1937) - Vanda Muroff (final film role)

References

External links

Photographs and literature

1906 births
1988 deaths
20th-century American actresses
American film actresses
American silent film actresses
American stage actresses
Norwegian ballerinas
Norwegian emigrants to the United States
Norwegian film actresses
Norwegian silent film actresses
20th-century Norwegian actresses
Actresses from Oslo